Space Force is the 26th solo studio album by American singer-songwriter Todd Rundgren. The album was released on October 14, 2022, by Cleopatra Records. Originally planned for a 2021 release, Rundgren stated the delay was due to Cleopatra Records' physical media release strategy.

Track listing 
All tracks co-written by Todd Rundgren, except "I'm Not your Dog" by Thomas Dolby and "Art in Resistance" by Neil Finn

References 

https://www.loudersound.com/reviews/space-force-a-revealing-glimpse-into-the-peculiar-musical-mind-of-todd-rundgren
https://atthebarrier.com/2022/10/12/todd-rundgren-space-force-album-review/
https://recordcollectormag.com/reviews/album/space-force
https://floodmagazine.com/120692/todd-rundgren-space-force/
https://www.buzzmag.co.uk/todd-rundgren-space-force-album-review/
https://www.ampeddistribution.com/2022/10/amped-featured-album-of-the-week-todd-rundgren-space-force
https://getreadytorock.me.uk/blog/2022/10/album-review-todd-rundgren-space-force/
https://www.youtube.com/watch?v=rxlC5kYLdkw&t=835s
https://thefirenote.com/reviews/todd-rundgren-space-force-album-review/
https://relix.com/articles/detail/todd-rundgren-on-his-space-force-bowies-space-oddity-the-mythology-of-vinyl-and-the-moral-imperative-of-music/
https://www.youtube.com/watch?v=2vXL4JuYONM

2022 albums
Todd Rundgren albums